Doğanlar can refer to the following villages in Turkey:

 Doğanlar, Balya
 Doğanlar, Çamlıdere
 Doğanlar, İscehisar
 Doğanlar, Laçin
 Doğanlar, Orta
 Doğanlar, Yığılca